Jameh Mosque of Sarabi is related to the Qajar dynasty and is located in Tuyserkan, Sarabi area.

Sources 

Mosques in Iran
Mosque buildings with domes
National works of Iran
Sarabi